Sawmill Branch is a  long 2nd order tributary to Smyrna River in New Castle County, Delaware.

Variant names
According to the Geographic Names Information System, it has also been known historically as:  
Northwest Branch

Course
Sawmill Branch rises in a pond on the Blackbird Creek divide about 1.5 miles southeast of Blackbird in New Castle County, Delaware.  Sawmill Branch then flows southeast to meet the Smyrna River about 1.5 miles southeast of Chambersville, Delaware.

Watershed
Sawmill Branch drains  of area, receives about 44.0 in/year of precipitation, has a topographic wetness index of 589.76 and is about 18.8% forested.

See also
List of rivers of Delaware

References 

Rivers of Delaware
Rivers of New Castle County, Delaware
Tributaries of the Smyrna River